Zenith Contract Services  is a privately owned group of companies based in Coventry, UK. 

Zenith Contract Services provide cleaning services, industrial flooring and commercial refitment, and painting and decorating services. They also sell their own range of flooring products, branded ZenRite, online.

Zenith Contract Services has grown from a small family business founded in 2002 by staff who had worked in cleaning, and painting & decorating for two decades.  In 2006 the company secured the backing of Yorkshire Bank, to grow and serve clients across the UK. This was achieved by moving into areas such as deep cleaning rental properties for local housing associations.

The group is made up of four limited companies:
 Zenith Contractors Ltd – Environmental, industrial, office & commercial cleaning.
 Zenith Refitment Services Ltd – The Painting and Decorating business, performing commercial refitment, office refurbishments, factory and machine painting.
 Zenith Pola Flooring Services Ltd (Renamed from Pola Flooring Services Ltd  - Installing epoxy, polyurethane and cementitious flooring systems for new-build and refurbishment projects.)
 ZenRite Ltd - An online store, selling Zenith’s own flooring products to the trade and individuals.

In August 2012 the company revealed a new brand image and website.

Clients have included Heathrow Airport and the Ricoh Arena.

References

Companies based in Coventry